Jassem Omar (Arabic:جاسم محمد عمر) (born 18 April 1995) is a Qatari footballer. He currently plays for Al Ahli.

External links

References

Qatari footballers
1995 births
Living people
Qatari expatriate footballers
Al Ahli SC (Doha) players
LASK players
FC Juniors OÖ players
Al-Duhail SC players
Aspire Academy (Qatar) players
Regionalliga players
Qatar Stars League players
Association football fullbacks
Footballers at the 2018 Asian Games
Asian Games competitors for Qatar
Expatriate footballers in Austria
Qatari expatriate sportspeople in Austria
Qatar youth international footballers
Qatar under-20 international footballers